Therbligs are 18 kinds of elemental motions, used in the study of motion economy in the workplace. A workplace task is analyzed by recording each of the therblig units for a process, with the results used for optimization of manual labour by eliminating unneeded movements.

The word therblig was the creation of Frank Bunker Gilbreth and Lillian Moller Gilbreth, American industrial psychologists who invented the field of time and motion study. It is a reversal of the name Gilbreth, with 'th' transposed.

The basic motion elements 

A basic motion element is one of a set of fundamental motions required for a worker to perform a manual operation or task. The set consists of 18 elements, each describing a standardized activity.

 Transport empty [unloaded] (TE): receiving an object with an empty hand. (Now called "Reach".)
 Grasp (G): grasping an object with the active hand.
 Transport loaded (TL): moving an object using a hand motion.
 Hold (H): holding an object.
 Release load (RL): releasing control of an object.
 Preposition (PP): positioning and/or orienting an object for the next operation and relative to an approximation location.
 Position (P): positioning and/or orienting an object in the defined location.
 Use (U): manipulating a tool in the intended way during the course working.
 Assemble (A): joining two parts together.
 Disassemble (DA): separating multiple components that were joined. 
 Search (Sh): attempting to find an object using the eyes and hands.
 Select (St): Choosing among several objects in a group.
 Plan (Pn): deciding on a course of action.
 Inspect (I): determining the quality or the characteristics of an object using the eyes and/or other senses.
Unavoidable delay (UD): waiting due to factors beyond the worker's control and included in the work cycle.
 Avoidable delay (AD): waiting within the worker's control which causes idleness that is not included in the regular work cycle.
 Rest (R): resting to overcome a fatigue, consisting of a pause in the motions of the hands and/or body during the work cycles or between them.
 Find (F): A momentary mental reaction at the end of the Search cycle. Seldom used.

Effective and ineffective basic motion elements 

Effective:
 Reach
 Move
 Grasp
 Release Load
 Use
 Assemble
 Disassemble
 Pre-Position

Ineffective:
 Hold
 Rest
 Position
 Search
 Select
 Plan
 Unavoidable Delay
 Avoidable Delay
 Inspect

Example usage
Here is an example of how therbligs can be used to analyze motion:

History

In an article published in 1915, Frank Gilbreth wrote of 16 elements: "The elements of a cycle of decisions and motions, either running partly or wholly concurrently with other elements in the same or other cycles, consist of the following, arranged in varying sequences: 1. Search, 2. Find, 3. Select, 4. Grasp, 5. Position, 6. Assemble, 7. Use, 8. Dissemble, or take apart, 9. Inspect, 10. Transport, loaded, 11. Pre-position for next operation, 12. Release load, 13. Transport, empty, 14. Wait (unavoidable delay), 15. Wait (avoidable delay), 16. Rest (for overcoming fatigue)."  (Motion Study for the Crippled Soldier, in Journal of the American Society of Mechanical Engineers, December 1915, page 671.)

Notes

References

 

 *

External links

The Gilbreth Network: Therbligs

Time and motion study